Alasanne Ates Diouf (born 24 March 2000) is a Senegalese footballer who plays for Lexington SC in USL League One.

Career

SIMA 
Diouf was spotted by SIMA Águilas head coach Mike Potempa in Dakar while playing as part of former Senegal international midfielder Salif Diao's Sport4Charity foundation and invited to move to America and enroll at the academy.

Orlando City B 
In 2019, Diouf was signed to Orlando City B ahead of their  inaugural USL League One season. On 30 March 2019, Diouf made his debut for Orlando City B in a 1–3 loss against FC Tucson. Diouf played the entire match. He scored his first goal for the team on April 14, 2019, in a 1–1 draw against South Georgia Tormenta.

Austin Bold 
On 21 April 2020, Diouf signed for USL Championship team Austin Bold having spent preseason on trial with the club although USL had already temporarily suspended play due to the COVID-19 pandemic in March. He scored his first goal for the club on August 8, 2020, in the 38' of a 4–1 home victory against RGV Toros.

San Antonio FC 
On 19 January 2022, Diouf joined San Antonio FC.

Lexington SC 
On 10 January 2023, Diouf was announced as the second professional signing by USL League One expansion side Lexington SC.

References

External links 
 
 Alasanne Ates Diouf at U.S. Soccer Development Academy

2000 births
Living people
Senegalese footballers
Senegalese expatriate footballers
Senegalese expatriates in the United States
Association football forwards
Expatriate soccer players in the United States
Montverde Academy alumni
SIMA Águilas players
Orlando City B players
Austin Bold FC players
San Antonio FC players
Soccer players from Florida
USL Championship players
USL League One players
USL League Two players
Footballers from Dakar
Lexington SC players